Robert Cole Sprague (born April 18, 1973) is an American politician serving as the 49th and current Ohio Treasurer of State. Prior to his election as treasurer, he represented the 83rd district in the Ohio House of Representatives, and served as city auditor and treasurer in his hometown of Findlay. He is a member of the Republican Party.

Personal life and early career
Sprague was raised in Findlay, Ohio, and graduated from Findlay High School. He then went on to Duke University, where he earned a BS in mechanical engineering, followed with an MBA from the University of North Carolina at Chapel Hill. After graduation, he worked at Ernst & Young in Atlanta, Georgia, as a project lead before starting his own consulting firm, advising businesses from London to Singapore. He moved back to Findlay, where he still resides with his wife Amanda and their five children. After leaving the private sector, he served as treasurer and auditor for the city, helping to improve its credit rating and lower debt service costs. He also started issuing an annual financial report to help taxpayers understand the city's finances.

Ohio House of Representatives
In 2011, then-Representative Cliff Hite was appointed to the Ohio Senate, creating a vacancy for the 83rd House District. Sprague was appointed to fill that seat, which he was re-elected to in 2012, 2014, and 2016.

During his time in the legislature, his was a leading voice on fiscal matters as a member of both the House Finance and Financial Institutions Committees. As a member of the General Assembly, he led efforts to combat the addiction crisis by working with law enforcement, community leaders, and doctors on preventing prescription drug abuse, reducing overdose deaths, and improving treatment systems.

Addressing drug addiction
As a freshman member of the General Assembly, Representative Sprague sat on the House Criminal Justice Committee.

At the time, Sprague was recognized for a sincere commitment to addressing the addiction crisis.

During the 130th General Assembly, Representative Sprague chaired a special committee that traveled the state gathering information on the opioid addiction crisis.

Through legislation he sponsored and supported, he was deeply involved in addressing many addiction related issues, including:

 Adding modules about prescription opioids and heroin addiction to Ohio's health curricula (H.B. 367);
 Increasing penalties for illegally providing controlled substances to pregnant women (HB 394); 
 Shutting down pill mills through revised pain management, prescribing, and dispensing regulations (H.B. 93); 
 Increasing access to the life-saving overdose reversing medication, naloxone (Narcan) (H.B. 4); 
 Creating Good Samaritan provisions for overdose situations, encouraging individuals to call for help (H.B. 110); 
 Providing the framework and funding to increase prevention efforts and ensure a full continuum of treatment services would be available to every Ohioan (H.B. 483) ;and 
 Providing the framework and funding to establish and increase the use of specialty drug dockets, which give courts flexibility for drug offenders, allowing them to place people with drug addictions into treatment and rehabilitation (H.B. 59).

Developmental Disabilities
In the 131st General Assembly, Representative Sprague was chairman of the House Finance Subcommittee on Health and Human Services. That biennium's operating budget, H.B. 64, addressed many DD-related issues.

As chairman, he had a significant role in guiding these provisions through the legislative process, such as providing more opportunities for individuals with disabilities to live and work in their community, while insuring institutional opportunities remained an option for individuals desiring that setting or requiring a higher level of care.

He also worked to include certain DD-related changes in H.B. 483.  Provisions included:

 Reforming the levy process for county boards of developmental disabilities;
 Designating October as Disability History and Awareness Month;
 Authorizing a personal income tax deduction for STABLE Account contributions;
 Authorizing residents of other states to open accounts under Ohio's STABLE program; and
 Authorizing the Treasurer of state to issue interest payments to beneficiaries.

Representative Sprague co-sponsored H.B. 158, legislation that removed references to “mental retardation” from the Ohio Revised Code.

Other
In March 2012, the Ohio House passed legislation sponsored by Representative Sprague that would increase the maximum amount that the Ohio Treasurer could invest in agricultural linked deposits from $125 million to $165 million. It also increased the maximum amount that could be loaned to farmers and agri-businesses from $100,000 to $150,000 per application. Governor John Kasich signed the bill on June 26, 2012.

Legislative Awards
While serving in the General Assembly, Sprague received multiple awards including the:

 Ohio Association of County Behavioral Health Authorities (OACBHA) Award for Legislative Excellence (2013); 
 Ohio Association of County Boards of Developmental Disabilities (OACB) Legislator of the Year (2014); 
 Public Children Services Association of Ohio (PCSAO) Outstanding Legislator of the Year (2015); 
 Center for Community Solutions (CCS) Award for Public Service (2016); 
 Ohio AMVETS Legislator of the Year (2017); and 
 Ohio American Legion Recognition Award (2018).

Ohio Treasurer
On March 7, 2017, Sprague announced his intention to run for the office of Ohio Treasurer.

During his run for office, Sprague received endorsements from the editorial boards of the Columbus Dispatch, Cleveland Plain Dealer, Akron Beacon Journal, and several other Ohio publications.

On November 6, 2018, Sprague was elected as Ohio's 49th Treasurer of State, defeating opponent Rob Richardson (D), 53% to 47%. He took office on January 11, 2019.

References

1973 births
21st-century American politicians
Duke University Pratt School of Engineering alumni
Living people
Republican Party members of the Ohio House of Representatives
Ohio Northern University alumni
People from Findlay, Ohio
State treasurers of Ohio
UNC Kenan–Flagler Business School alumni